Columbia Industries is a company involved in the manufacture and sale of bowling balls and ten-pin bowling-related accessories. Their most notable brand name is Columbia 300, which has produced some of the most well-known balls in the sport. Beginning in 1960 in Ephrata, Washington (near the Columbia River), Columbia Industries was the first manufacturer to successfully use polyester resin ("plastic") in bowling balls. Prior to this, nearly all bowling balls were made of a hard rubber material. The company later moved to San Antonio, Texas.

Columbia 300 pro staff members include PBA Tour champions Josh Blanchard and Jakob Butturff, plus PWBA and international champions Clara Guerrero, Sandra Gongora and Missy Parkin.

Columbia Industries purchased the Track and Dyno-Thane bowling ball brands in the early 2000s. In February 2007, Columbia announced that all of its brands had been acquired by Ebonite International. From February 2007 through November 2019, all Columbia Industries-related products were manufactured and owned by Ebonite International of Hopkinsville, Kentucky. On November 15, 2019, Ebonite International and all of its brands were subsequently purchased by Brunswick Bowling Products, LLC. Columbia 300-branded bowling balls are now manufactured in Brunswick plants run by BlueArc Capital Management.

Since the 80s, Columbia have sponsored the John Jowdy scholarships for gifted college bowlers.

References

Ten-pin bowling equipment manufacturers